"Run to You" is a song by Canadian singer-songwriter Bryan Adams. It was released in 1984 as the lead single from his fourth album, Reckless (1984). The track deals with the subject of infidelity, and is sung from the perspective of a man who declares that he will continue to "run to" his seductive mistress over his faithful partner; critic Ira Robbins for CMJ called it a "cheating classic". In the accompanying music video, however, Adams portrays his guitar as the object of desire.

The song topped the Billboard Top Rock Tracks chart and peaked at number six on the Billboard Hot 100. It has appeared on all of his compilation albums. The single was certified Gold in Canada in 1985.

Writing and recording
After a tour in Asia, Adams started the recording for Reckless. The recording for "Run to You" started on March 27, 1984, at Little Mountain Sound, Vancouver, Canada and continued through the middle of the year. It was mixed on September 21, 1984, in New York by Jim Vallance. The song, written January 10, 1983, became the last song written for Reckless. Adams and Vallance originally wrote the song for Blue Öyster Cult, but the group turned it down. The song was then offered to .38 Special, who also declined to record the song.

Adams wrote the riff by jamming on his guitar, but never took it seriously because he had added a "really silly...background vocal part" to the demo that obscured the riff's potential. After writing the rest of the song and deciding to record it, he brought his entire band into the studio, and he said hearing the whole band play it "was like hearing the song for the first time. And that first take is what you hear on the album now."
The UK 12 inch single (AMY224) states on the rear of the sleeve that contains a "specially remixed version" and that the "original version appears on the A+M album Reckless AMA5013". However, the label states that the track is taken from the album with a running time of 3min 59 sec.

Release and reception
"Run to You" was released worldwide on October 18, 1984, and became one of the most successful songs from Reckless on the American rock charts and arguably one of Bryan Adams's most recognizable and popular songs. It was his first number one song on the Billboard Top Rock Tracks chart, a position it held for four weeks, and it spent an additional five weeks at number two (all behind Don Henley's "Boys of Summer").  It also reached number six on the Billboard Hot 100. "Run to You" reached the top 20 on the Canadian singles chart and remained there for seven weeks, peaking at number four. It held the highest Canadian chart position Adams had attained at the time of release and became his third top-20 single in Canada. It was nominated for a Juno award for song of the year in Canada.  "Run to You" was released the following month in Ireland and peaked at number eight and reached number 11 on the UK Singles Chart. It was his second single to chart in Europe.

Billboard said it was "Full-blast rock" and that "Adams' raspy attack wrestles pop hooks into submission."  Stewart Mason from AllMusic said "Run to You" was the first of the album's six top 30 hits, and in retrospect, "one of the weakest of the lot. Although the song has a thundering chorus, the kind that sounds truly excellent blasting through FM speakers, there is quite literally not much else to the song: of the song's nearly four-minute length, over half of the song is devoted to repeats of the chorus and an unimaginative instrumental breakdown that leads into a seemingly endless vamp on the chorus to fade."
The long instrumental is indicative of the theme of the music video where the protagonist is serenading his guitar as the object of his affection.

In 1984, the song was promoted heavily in an episode of the NBC sitcom Double Trouble. The song was also featured in the 2002 video game Grand Theft Auto: Vice City.

Music video
The music video was shot in London, England and later Los Angeles. Directed by Steve Barron, it was nominated for the 1985 MTV Video Music Awards in five different categories: Best Direction, Best Special Effects, Best Art Direction, Best Editing, and Best Cinematography. While the song did not win any of the awards, it has received more MTV Video Music Award nominations than any other of Adams' songs.
The English actress Lysette Anthony appears in the video.

Personnel
 Bryan Adams – vocals, rhythm guitar
 Keith Scott – rhythm guitar, lead guitar
 Tommy Mandel – keyboards
 Dave Taylor – bass
 Mickey Curry – drums
 Jim Vallance – percussion

Charts

Weekly charts

Year-end charts

Certifications

Rage version

English urban dance act Rage (known as En-Rage in some European countries) covered "Run to You" in 1992. After having failed to chart when released the first time in May 1992, the single gained an unexpected boost in popularity due to controversy in the UK music media about the band's name: they shared their name with a German heavy metal band who had been recording under the same since 1984. After changing their name to En-Rage in some European countries to avoid legal action from the German band, they re-released the single six months later, and this time, it peaked at number three in the UK (eight places higher than the Bryan Adams version) in November 1992.

Track listings
 CD-maxi
 "Run to You"  – 3:41	
 "Run to You"  – 3:57	
 "Run to You  – 5:43	
 "Ease the Pain"  – 5:02

Charts

Weekly charts

Year-end charts

References

External links
 Classic Tracks: Bryan Adams 'Run to You'

1984 singles
1992 debut singles
Bryan Adams songs
Music videos directed by Steve Barron
Songs written by Jim Vallance
Songs written by Bryan Adams
Songs about infidelity
A&M Records singles
Song recordings produced by Bob Clearmountain
1984 songs